Lindsay Skoll CMG is a British diplomat. Since 2021, she has served as the Ambassador of the United Kingdom to Austria and the UK Permanent Representative to the United Nations and other International Organisations in Vienna.

Education
Skoll obtained a BA in History with Russian from the University of Nottingham.

Career
Skoll joined the Foreign and Commonwealth Office in 1996, having previously worked for the Japanese Ministry of Education.

High Commissioner to the Republic of Seychelles
Skoll was British High Commissioner to the Republic of Seychelles between 2012 and 2015. Upon leaving the post, she called her mission "eventful, but hopeful". She officiated at the first same sex marriage to occur in Seychelles. The marriage was between two men, one a British national and the other a Seychellois national who held a British passport.

Seychelles Principal Secretary for Foreign Affairs Maurice Loustau-Lalanne described Skoll's decision to conduct the marriage as “lacking in sensitivity”. The British High Commission responded to criticism by stating that the men “were legally entitled to be married by an appropriate British official on British territory”.

Deputy Head of Mission, Moscow
Skoll served as Deputy Head of Mission at the Embassy of the United Kingdom, Moscow between 2018 and 2020. She gave a speech during the 2018 FIFA World Cup at Volgograd, where she paid tribute to the sacrifice of the people of Volgograd during the Second World War, when the city was known as Stalingrad.

Ambassador to Austria
She was appointed Ambassador to Austria in September 2021.

References 

Living people
British women ambassadors
Members of HM Diplomatic Service
Year of birth missing (living people)
Companions of the Order of St Michael and St George
21st-century British diplomats